Chilham railway station is a railway station in Chilham, Kent. The station, and all trains serving it, are operated by Southeastern.

History

There are level crossings near both ends of the station, since the SER were unsure about the levels of traffic on the line and decided to cross several roads at-grade instead of bridges. Trains that delayed cars at the crossings for more than five minutes would be fined.

The station attracted attention from other railway companies. In retrospect, this turned out to be a mistake as the East Kent Railway, later to become the London, Chatham & Dover Railway (LCDR), built their own line to Faversham, competing with the SER for London - Thanet traffic. This plan was withdrawn after the SER realised such a scheme would probably involve also constructing a line from Canterbury to Dover.

Goods services were withdrawn from the station on 15 August 1966.

Accidents and incidents
On 20 October 1848, a fish and luggage train was derailed near Chilham when a bridge over the River Stour was washed away under it. All three crew were uninjured.
On 11 August 1858, an excursion train was derailed near Chilham. Three people were killed.
The driver of the lorry and the guard of the train were killed.
Two carriages were derailed. There were no injuries amongst the 70 passengers.

Services
All services at Chilham are operated by Southeastern using  EMUs.

The typical off-peak service in trains per hour is:
 1 tph to London Charing Cross via 
 1 tph to 

During the peak hours, the station is also served by trains to London Cannon Street.

The station is also served by a single early morning service to London St Pancras International, operated by a  EMU.

References
Citations

Sources

External links

Official report into 1858 accident

Railway stations in Kent
DfT Category F2 stations
Transport in the Borough of Ashford
Former South Eastern Railway (UK) stations
Railway stations in Great Britain opened in 1846
Railway stations served by Southeastern
1846 establishments in England